Events in the year 1937 in India.

Incumbents
 Emperor of India – George VI
 Viceroy of India – Victor Hope, 2nd Marquess of Linlithgow

Events 
 National income –  31,708 million
 Provincial autonomy begins (1 April) with Congress winning an absolute majority in many states, viz Madras, the United Provinces, Bihar, Central Provinces and Orissa. In Bombay, they were in position to form ministry with the support of independents. Non-congress coalition ministries were established in Bengal, Punjab, Sindh, NWFP (Khan Saheb defeating Muslim League) and Assam. Of them, only Punjab and Bengal were non-congress ministries. The All India Congress Committee renounced the proposition of non-acceptance of office. However, the Congress ministries did not accept office in the majority provinces, until they were assured by the Viceroy non-usage of his special powers in day-to-day administration. Muslim league fared badly in these elections, failing to secure a majority even in Muslim majority states but it still demanded that the Congress should admit its representatives in all Provincial ministries. The league refused to regard Muslims in congress ministries as representatives of the Muslim community. Congress refused to accept same, hence widening their gap. Jinnah reiterated his 14 points and took the road to two nation theory.
 20 February – Completion of election to legislative assemblies.
 1 April – Provincial autonomy began; Burma and Aden are separated from India.
 13 September – The new Viceroy's speech is boycotted by Congress.
 University of Kerala was set up.
 All India Football Federation was established

Law
 1 October – The Federal Court of India was established in India under the provisions of Government of India Act, 1935 with original, appellate and advisory jurisdictions.
 Bicameral legislature of Assam province came into existence
Agricultural Produce (Grading and Marking) Act
Muslim Personal Law (Shariat) Application Act
Arya Marriage Validation Act

Births

January to June
 2 January – Chandrashekhara Kambara, poet, playwright, folklorist and film director.
 4 February – Birju Maharaj, dancer (died 2022)
 22 February – Sabitri Chatterjee, actress.
 22 March – Hemendra Singh Panwar, conservationist. 
 1 April –  Mohammad Hamid Ansari, politician, Vice President of India
 26 April – Stan Swamy, Roman Catholic priest (died 2021)
 26 May – Manorama, actress. (died 2015)
 9 June – Ramchandra Gandhi, philosopher, grandson of Mahatma Gandhi (died 2007).
 24 June – Anita Desai, novelist.

July to December
 24 July – Manoj Kumar, actor and director.
 22 August – Maria Aurora Couto, writer and educator (died 2022).
 6 November – Yashwant Sinha, politician and minister.
 8 November – Bharath Gopi, actor, director and producer (died 2008).
 2 December – Manohar Joshi, Politician, 12th Chief Minister of Maharashtra.
 3 December – Binod Bihari Verma, writer (died 2003).
 28 December – Ratan Tata, businessman, Chairman of the Tata Group.

Full date unknown
 Jasodhara Bagchi, feminist critic and activist. (died 2015)

Deaths
 23 November – Jagadish Chandra Bose, physicist, biologist, botanist, archaeologist and science fiction writer (born 1858).

References

 
India
Years of the 20th century in India